The Wicked Day is the fourth novel in Mary Stewart's treatment of Arthurian legend. It was published by Hodder & Stoughton in 1983. It is preceded in the pentalogy by The Last Enchantment (1979), and succeeded by The Prince and the Pilgrim (1995).

Overview
The protagonists of the story are Mordred and his father the king, Arthur. Lost as a youth, Mordred is raised by fisherfolk until he is returned to his birth mother Morgause. The novel portrays Mordred as a pawn of fate unlike many tales which paint him as the villain of the Arthurian saga.

The novel covers the time after Merlin's self-imposed exile and stretches to the deaths of Mordred and Arthur.

References 

1983 British novels
Modern Arthurian fiction
British fantasy novels
Novels by Mary Stewart
Novels set in sub-Roman Britain
Ballantine Books books